National Accreditation Board for Hospitals & Healthcare Providers), abbreviated as NABH, is a constituent board of Quality Council of India (QCI), set up to establish and operate accreditation programme for healthcare organizations. Formed in 2005, it is the principal accreditation for hospitals in India.

Overview
Organisations like the Quality Council of India and its National Accreditation Board for Hospitals & Healthcare Providers have designed an exhaustive healthcare standard for hospitals and healthcare providers. Hospitals are assessed on over 600 paramaters, the standards are divided between patient centered standards and organization centred standards. To comply with these standard elements, the hospital will need to have a process-driven approach in all aspects of hospital activities – from registration, admission, pre-surgery, peri-surgery and post-surgery protocols, discharge from the hospital to follow up with the hospital after discharge. Not only the clinical aspects but the governance aspects are to process driven based on clear and transparent policies and protocols. NABH aims at streamlining the entire operations of a hospital.

NABH is equivalent to JCI and other International standards including HAS: Haute Authorite de Sante, Australian Council on Healthcare Standards, the Japan Council for Quality in Health Care and the National Committee for Quality Assurance in the United States. Its standards have been accredited by ISQUA the apex body accrediting the accreditators hence making NABH accreditation at par with the world's most leading hospital accreditation.

The official website of QCI should be referred for application and implementation of healthcare standards. The Quality Council of India works under the guidance of Ministry of Commerce.

History

NABH accreditation system was established in 2006 as a constituent of Quality Council of India (QCI). The first edition of standards was released in 2006 and after that the standards has been revised every 3 years. Currently the 5th edition of NABH standards, released in Aug. 2020 is in use.

The first hospital to be accredited by NABH is B M Birla Heart Research Center, till date more than 838 hospitals in India has achieved accreditation by NABH. In public hospitals, Gandhinagar General hospital was the first to get NABH accreditation in 2009.

Standards
,
The NABH standards 4th edition standards are documented in 10 chapters, which are as follows

 Access, Assessment and Continuity of Care
 Care of Patients (COP)
 Management of Medication (MOM)
 Patient Rights and Education (PRE)
 Hospital Infection Control (HIC)
 Patients safety and quality improvement (PSQ)
 Responsibilities of Management (ROM)
 Facility Management and Safety (FMS)
 Human Resource Management (HRM)
 Information Management System (IMS)

References

External links
 NABH Official website

Medical and health organisations based in India
Accreditation in healthcare
Accreditation organizations